Bancroft Airport  is adjacent to Bancroft, Ontario, Canada.

The airport is operated by the Bancroft Flying Club and is freely available to the general public. Due to high terrain near both ends of the runway, pilots typically use a non-standard circuit, following the York River valley through the town for departing from runway 12 or landing on runway 30.

References

Registered aerodromes in Ontario